Aleksey Suvorov (born  in Chelyabinsk) is a Russian speed-skater.

Suvorov competed at the 2014 Winter Olympics for Russia. In the 1500 metres he finished 25th.

Suvorov made his World Cup debut in November 2011. As of September 2014, Suvorov's top World Cup finish is 18th, in a pair of 1500m races in 2013–14. His best overall finish in the World Cup is 29th, in the 2013–14 1500m.

References 

1991 births
Living people
Russian male speed skaters
Speed skaters at the 2014 Winter Olympics
Olympic speed skaters of Russia
Sportspeople from Chelyabinsk